The 26th Legislative Assembly of Saskatchewan was elected in the 2007 Saskatchewan election, and was sworn in on November 21, 2007. It sat until May 19, 2011. It was controlled by the Saskatchewan Party under Premier Brad Wall.

Members

Standings changes since the 26th general election

References
 

Terms of the Saskatchewan Legislature